Daylight Dies is a melodic death-doom band from North Carolina, United States.

History

Daylight Dies was formed in 1996 by Barre Gambling and Jesse Haff. In 1999, the two recorded the band's first demo, The Long Forgotten Demo. In 2000, Guthrie Iddings joined the band as the vocalist and the trio recorded the band's second demo, Idle, which was released through Tribunal Records. In 2001, Egan O'Rourke joined as the bassist and the band recorded a two-song demo that was meant for record labels only. In late 2001, they signed with Relapse Records.

In 2002, Daylight Dies released their debut studio album, No Reply. Afterwards the band toured Europe with Katatonia and the United States and Canada with Lacuna Coil in support of the album. After the tour, vocalist Guthrie Iddings left the band to pursue a career and was replaced by Nathan Ellis. Charley Shackelford also joined as a second guitarist. In November 2005, Daylight Dies signed with Candlelight Records and released their second studio album Dismantling Devotion in March 2006.

On July 13 and 14, 2006, Daylight Dies performed as main support for Emperor in New York City. The band premiered their first music video for the song "Lies That Bind" on August 9, 2006. Between October 20 and November 19, 2006 they embarked on their first full North American tour in support of Dismantling Devotion together with Portugal's Moonspell and Sweden's Katatonia.

Daylight Dies entered the studio in December 2007 to begin recording their third album Lost to the Living. Like Dismantling Devotion, the album was mixed and mastered by Jens Bogren at Fascination Street Studios. After the album's release in 2008, the band supported it with two North American tours—one with Candlemass and another with Soilwork, Darkane and Swallow the Sun.

The band recorded their fourth full-length album in late 2011, entitled A Frail Becoming. The album was again mixed and mastered by Jens Bogren at Fascination Street Studios and was released by Candlelight Records in 2012.

Band members

Current members
 Nathan Ellis – harsh vocals (2004–present)
 Barre Gambling – guitars (1996–present), bass (2000)
 Charley Shackelford – guitars (2004–present)
 Egan O'Rourke – bass, clean vocals (2001–present)
 Jesse Haff – drums (1996–present)

Former members
 Matthew Golombisky – bass (1999), contrabass (2006, as sessionist), strings/woodwinds (2008, as sessionist) 
 Guthrie Iddings – harsh vocals (2000–2004)

Session musicians
 Johnny Wooten – harsh vocals (1999)
 Robert Daugherty – live guitars (2003)

Discography

Studio albums
 No Reply (2002, Relapse)
 Dismantling Devotion (2006, Candlelight)
 Lost to the Living (2008, Candlelight)
 A Frail Becoming (2012, Candlelight)

Singles
 A Portrait in White (2008, Candlelight)

Live albums
 Live at the Contamination Festival (2005, Relapse)

Demo
 The Long Forgotten (1999, Self-released/Independent)
Line up:
 Jesse Haff – 	drums
 Barre Gambling – guitars
 Matthew Golombisky – 	bass 
Session:
 Johnny Wooten – harsh vocals

EP
 Idle (2000, Tribunal Records)
Line up:
 Barre Gambling – guitars, bass
 Jesse Haff – drums
 Guthrie Iddings – harsh vocals

External links
 Daylight Dies - official website
 Daylight Dies - official Facebook
 Candlelight Records 
 

Heavy metal musical groups from North Carolina
American doom metal musical groups
American melodic death metal musical groups
Relapse Records artists
Musical groups established in 1996
Musical quintets
Candlelight Records artists